Noah Idechong is an environmental activist from Palau, and former chief of Palau's Governmental Division of Marine Resources, where he helped draft the Island's first marine conservation legislation in 1997.  Having linked marine science, fisheries, and political reform in Palau, he was awarded the Goldman Environmental Prize in 1995 for his efforts in marine conservation.  Idechong helped found the Palau Conservation Society, which spearheaded revivals in traditional conservation, now proven as effective management measures in the Micronesia region.

He later served as a member of the House of Delegates of Palau since the 2000 elections, helping to enact progressive, conservation-oriented public programs, such as the Protected Areas Network, the Micronesia Challenge, and the word's first Shark Sanctuary. He served as the speaker of the House of Delegates of Palau from 15 January 2009 to November 2012.

References

Palauan environmentalists
Speakers of the House of Delegates of Palau
Living people
Palauan activists
Year of birth missing (living people)
Goldman Environmental Prize awardees
21st-century Palauan politicians